Rineloricaria anitae is a species of catfish in the family Loricariidae. It is native to South America, where it occurs in the Canoas River in Brazil. The species reaches 11.7 cm (4.6 inches) in standard length and is believed to be a facultative air-breather.

References 

Fish described in 2008
Freshwater fish of Brazil
Catfish of South America
Loricariini